There are two historic Salisbury Factory Buildings in Worcester, Massachusetts.  The first of these, at 25 Union Street, was built in 1879, and is a five-story brick building with modest Victorian Gothic trim.  The second, at 49-51 Union Street, was built in 1882, is a three-story brick building designed by local architect Stephen Earle.  These two buildings are the only ones that survive of a series of factory buildings built by Stephen Salisbury II and Stephen Salisbury III in the Lincoln Square area north of Worcester's downtown.  The Salisburys rented space out to small manufacturers in these buildings, introducing a trend that dominated the industrial development of the city.  Most of their buildings were demolished during redevelopment of the area in the 20th century.

Both buildings were listed on the National Register of Historic Places in 1980.

See also
National Register of Historic Places listings in northwestern Worcester, Massachusetts
National Register of Historic Places listings in Worcester County, Massachusetts

References

Industrial buildings and structures on the National Register of Historic Places in Massachusetts
Industrial buildings completed in 1882
Buildings and structures in Worcester, Massachusetts
National Register of Historic Places in Worcester, Massachusetts
1882 establishments in Massachusetts